Theretra wetanensis is a moth of the  family Sphingidae. It is found on Wetan Island, part of the Moluccas in Indonesia.

References

Theretra
Moths described in 2010